, also called Farewell to Space Battleship Yamato or Arrivederci Yamato, is the second film based on the classic manga and anime series Space Battleship Yamato (known as Star Blazers in the United States) and the sequel to Space Battleship Yamato (1977).  

Set three years after the events of the first film, Yamato must protect Earth from another tyrannical alien race in the form of the White Comet Empire, who prove to be a much griever threat. This same storyline would be reused and expanded on later in the same year on TV in Space Battleship Yamato II, albeit with a different ending.

Plot

Three years after their destructive war with Gamilas, humanity has largely recovered. Meanwhile in the distant reaches of space, the tyrannical White Comet Empire led by the Emperor Zordar sets its sights on Earth to conquer and enslave mankind. Dessler, leader of the Gamilas, is revived by them and pledges his loyalty. He vows revenge on the Yamato under the supervision of Comet Empire officer Miru.

Susumi Kodai and Yuki Mori, former crewmates of the Yamato, have become engaged. Kodai commands a destroyer in a cargo escort fleet. While returning to Earth from patrol, his ship receives a mysterious message. Upon his arrival, Kodai, along with the rest of Yamato's crew, commemorate the anniversary of her arrival. Kodai and the others believe that the world has become too complacent with their newfound peace, feeling that people have taken for granted the sacrifices Yamato endured to earn it. This feeling is further bolstered by the christening of the EDF's newest state-of-the-art flagship Andromeda, which will succeed the Yamato.

With the help of science officer Sanada, the message is analyzed. It warns of a looming threat. Sanada further explains that a comet has been spotted rapidly approaching Earth. Kodai believes the two are connected. He urgently tries to warn the EDF defense council but is dismissed. When the Yamato's crew is informed that the battleship is to be decommissioned, Kodai inspires them to mutiny and seek the source of the message themselves. Kodai urges Yuki to stay on Earth for her safety, but she secretly boards. Shima initially disagrees, balking at disobeying orders. A group of rowdy space marines commanded by Hajime Saito join them. Kodai helms the ship himself as they launch, but Shima reveals himself and takes his station. Upon reaching space, the ship is joined by the Black Tiger squadron. Encountering a distress signal, the battleship rescues Captain Ryu Hijikata from the wreckage of a patrol fleet that had just been attacked by White Comet Empire forces. The Yamato and her crew are welcomed back into EDF command, and Hijikata is assigned captain.

Yamato receives another message, which they learn was sent by an alien named Teresa. She is held captive on her home planet Telezart by the Empire. Yamato warps there and fights her way through enemy forces to free Teresa. She explains that she is the sole survivor of her kind who had been wiped out by the Comet Empire, and that the White Comet itself conceals a base inside. Kodai pleads Teresa to join them but she cannot; She is made of anti-matter, so any contact between her and real matter would cause a massive explosion. She vanishes and prays for Earth's victory.

Yamato departs Telezart, but is ambushed by Dessler. The Yamato takes the upper hand in the ensuing fight. As Yuki secretly follows him, Kodai infiltrates Dessler's ship and confronts the dictator. Kodai asks him why he continues to fight even after Gamilas's destruction. Dessler replies that it is to avenge the humiliation he suffered from Yamato. In the ensuing standoff Dessler succumbs to his wounds, Yuki is shot by Miru while saving Kodai, and Dessler shoots Miru dead. Dessler realizes that his spirit was closer to Yamato's then the Comet Empire's and asks Kodai for forgiveness. He divulges the Comet's weakness: the spiral core. He urges Kodai to defeat then, then voids himself into space.

As Yamato desperately races back, the Comet Empire starts its attack on Earth. The EDF fleet led by Andromeda easily fends off the first wave. Yamato warps to Earth in time to see the EDF fleet decimated. Yamato takes aim and fires at the Comet's spiral core with the Wave Motion Gun, seemingly destroying it. But the massive base, Gatlantis, is revealed. Yamato advances but sustains grievous losses. Most of her crew including Dr. Sado, Analyzer, Captain Hijikata and Yuki are killed.

Kodai, joined by Sanada and the space marines, pilots a fighter and leads the Black Tigers to infiltrate Gatlantis. They fight their way to Gatlantis's core, where Sanada and Saito sacrifice themselves to destroy the core while Kodai escapes. Kodai orders Yamato to open fire on Gatlantis. The alien base cracks open, revealing a massive battleship hidden inside. Zordar boasts at Yamato, declaring himself the ruler of the universe. Crippled beyond repair and hopelessly outmatched, Kodai confers with the spirit of Captain Okita, who tells Kodai that he has one last weapon to fight with: his life.

Kodai orders the few surviving crewmen to leave the ship. Shima and the crew realize his intentions and protest but Kodai convinces them, stating that by sacrificing himself, he will not truly die. The crew disembarks and salutes him as he steers Yamato into a collision course with Zordar's battleship. Teresa appears before Kodai and is inspired to sacrifice herself as well, amplifying Yamatos power with her anti-matter body. Kodai sees himself surrounded by the spirits of his crew, including Yuki. Yamato vanishes in a bright flash.

Voice cast

Kei Tomiyama as Susumu Kodai
Youko Asagami as Yuki Mori
Akira Kamiya as Saburou Katou
Akira Kimura as Captain Hijikata Ryu
Bin Shimada as Aide
Chikao Ohtsuka as Balzey
Eiji Shima as Pilot
Eken Mine as Politician A
Goro Naya as Jūzō Okita
Shusei Nakamura as Daisuke Shima
Ichirô Murakoshi as Goenitz / Politician B
Ichirô Nagai as Hikozaemon Tokugawa / Sakezou Sado
Isao Sasaki as Hajime Saito
Kazue Komiya as Sabera
Kazuo Hayashi as Yasuo Nanbu
Kazuyuki Sogabe as Akira Yamamoto / Larzeler
Kenichi Ogata as Announcer
Kiyoshi Kobayashi as Zordar
Kouji Yada as Science Director / Taran
Kousei Tomita as Zavival
Mahito Tsujimura as Andromeda Captain / Staff Officer
Masato Ibu as Desler / Heikurou Todo
Michihiro Ikemizu as Underling
Miyuki Ueda as Teresa
Osamu Ichikawa as Miru
Osamu Saka as Gorrand Staff Official / President
Shinji Nomura as Yoshikazu Aihara
Taichirou Hirokawa as Narrator
Takeshi Aono as Shirou Sanada
Tetsuya Kaji as Earth Commander in Chief
Yoshito Yasuhara as Kenjirou Oota / Politician C

Production

In 1977 the first film of the series, Space Battleship Yamato, outperformed Star Wars at the Japanese box office. This led to the production of Farewell to Space Battleship Yamato, which was released in 1978. It was originally intended to conclude the story, but a third film, Be Forever Yamato, was released two years later. Farewell to Space Battleship Yamato had a total budget of 510million ($5.1million), including 360million ($3.6million) for production and 150million ($1.5million) for advertising.

Notes

References

External links
 Starblazers Official website 
 
 

1978 anime films
1970s action films
1970s science fiction films
Animated films based on animated series
Films directed by Toshio Masuda
Films set in the 23rd century
Japanese animated science fiction films
1970s Japanese-language films
Japanese science fiction action films
Space Battleship Yamato films